The following human polls made up the 2020 NCAA Division I women's softball rankings.  The NFCA/USA Today Poll was voted on by a panel of 32 Division I softball coaches. The ESPN.com/USA Softball Collegiate Poll was voted on by a panel of 20 voters. The NFCA/USA Today poll, the Softball America poll, the ESPN.com/USA Softball Collegiate rankings, and D1Softball ranked the top 25 teams nationally.

Legend

NFCA/USA Today
The final NFCA/USA Today poll was announced on April 7, 2020 after the 2020 NCAA Division I softball season was cancelled due to COVID-19.

ESPN.com/USA Softball Collegiate Top 25
The final ESPN.com/USA Softball Collegiate Top 25 poll was announced on April 7, 2020 after the 2020 NCAA Division I softball season was cancelled due to COVID-19.

D1Softball

Softball America
The final Softball America poll was announced on March 24, 2020 after the 2020 NCAA Division I softball season was cancelled due to COVID-19.

References

Rankings
College softball rankings in the United States